This is the list of current, upcoming and formerly broadcast series by the Indian television channel Dangal TV.

Current broadcasts

Upcoming broadcasts

Formerly broadcasts 
Acquired series

Original programming

Anthology series

Children/teen series

Comedy series

Drama series

Mythological series

{|class="wikitable"
!Year
!Name
|-
|2022
|Brij Ke Gopal
|-
|2020–2021
|Dwarkadheesh Bhagwaan Shree Krishn - Sarvkala Sampann
|-
|2020–2021
|Devi Adi Parashakti|-
|2022
|Jai Hanuman - Sankat Mochan Naam Tiharo|-
|2020
|Katha - Vishwas Ke Ithihaas Ki|}

Reality/Non-Scripted programmingAb Khulega Rahasya Zayake Ka (2018)Bahurani'' (2017)

References 

Dangal TV original programming
Lists of television series by network
Enterr10 Television Network
Dangal